Sør-Gjæslingan is an archipelago in Nærøysund, Trøndelag, Norway.

References

External links 

 

Archipelagoes of Norway
Archipelagoes of the Norwegian Sea
Fishing communities in Norway